Andries Mahoney (born 29 January 1985) is a South African rugby union player, currently playing with the . His regular position is scrum-half.

Career

Youth

Leopards
In 2006, he was included in the senior squad for the 2006 Vodacom Cup competition and made his debut in the final game of the season against . He made 17 appearances in total for them in 2006 and 2007, but failed to establish himself and reverted to playing Varsity Cup rugby with his university side  in 2008, 2009 and 2010.

Griffons

Representative rugby
In 2012, he was selected for the South African Barbarians (North) team against  that toured South Africa as part of the 2012 mid-year rugby test series.

References

South African rugby union players
Living people
1985 births
Griffons (rugby union) players
Leopards (rugby union) players
Rugby union scrum-halves
Rugby union players from North West (South African province)